The following is a list of 2022 box office number-one films in Italy.

Highest-grossing films of 2022

See also
 List of 2023 box office number-one films in Italy

References 

2022
Italy
2022 in Italian cinema